John Burrell or John Burel (fl. 1590) was a Scottish poet and goldsmith.

He was the author of a poetical description of the entry of Queen Anne (Anne of Denmark) into Edinburgh in 1590, titled The Discription of the Queenis Maiesties most honourable entry into the town of Edinburgh. According to Burel, performers with black masks or visards represented the "Moirs" of "the Inds" who lived in comparative ease and comfort by the golden mountain of "Synerdas". They had come to salute Scotland's new queen and offer to her service their "most willing minds". 

Among the title-deeds of a small property at the foot of Todricks Wynd, Edinburgh, there was found a disposition of a house by John Burrel, goldsmith, yane of the printers in his majesties cunzie house (king's mint) in 1628. From the minuteness with which the poet describes the jewellery displayed on Queen Anne's entry, it appears that he had a special technical knowledge of such matters, and there is thus every reason to suppose him to have been identical with John Burrel of the king's mint. The poem, along with another by the same author, titled The Passage of the Pilgrims, divided into four parts, was published in Watson's Collection of Scots Poems and the former is also included in Sir Robert Sibbald's Chronicle of Scottish Poetry. Neither of the poems possesses any literary merit.

His translation of a medieval verse drama Pamphilus based on works of Ovid seems to address the events of 1591, when the young courtier Ludovic Stewart, 2nd Duke of Lennox was advised to end his relationship with Lilias Ruthven.

Burrell may have been involved in the entertainment of the Duke of Holstein at Riddle's Court by the burgh of Edinburgh in 1598. The account for the banquet includes payments to the schoolmasters Johne Black and Robert Burrell, to William Douglas, and to "Johne Burrell", who received £3-6s-8d Scots.

In 1601 Francis Mowbray wrote to Sir Robert Cecil from Edinburgh complaining about John Burrell who was in London and had ridiculed him in verse and had a sonnet against him published. Mowbray enclosed a copy of the printed poem (which survives) and wanted the poet put in prison.

References

16th-century Scottish people
Scottish poets
Scottish goldsmiths